Callidula petavius is a moth in the  family Callidulidae. It is found on Ambon and the southern Moluccas.

References

Callidulidae
Moths described in 1781